Ceraesignum maximum is a species of gastropods belonging to the family Vermetidae.

The species is found in Indian and Pacific Ocean. It lives on coral reefs and is edible. Distinct genetic populations exist due to oceanic isolation.

References

Vermetidae
Gastropods described in 1825
Molluscs of the Indian Ocean
Molluscs of the Pacific Ocean
Edible molluscs